Mary Warren may refer to:
 Mary Warren (Salem witch trials) (died 1693), oldest accuser during the 1692 Salem witch trials
 Mary Warren (actress) (1893–1956), American actress in silent films
 Mary Schäffer Warren (1861–1939), American-Canadian naturalist, illustrator, photographer, and writer
 Mary Anne Warren (1946–2010), American writer and philosophy professor
 Mary Evalin Warren, American author, lecturer, and social reformer